Cheiridopsis denticulata is a species in the genus Cheiridopsis native to South Africa. It has yellow flowers, and distinctive foliage with a narrow, upward curving shape. Commonly called "pink fingers" (pienkvingers in Afrikaans), the leaves grow in opposite pairs and are light blue with sun exposure blushing them shades of pink and purple.

References

denticulata
Taxa named by N. E. Brown
Taxa named by Adrian Hardy Haworth